The John P. Devaney was a fireboat operated briefly by the Fire Department of New York City in 1994. The boat was named after a firefighter who lost his life in the line of duty.

The John P. Devaney, and her sister ship, the Alfred E. Ronaldson, were experimental "surface effect ship" designs, a design related to hovercraft.
The vessels had a pair of catamaran hulls. The vessels' fibreclass hulls were shipped from Europe. They came equipped with a high-tech sensor suite.

The vessels were expensive, costing $3.5 million each.  But after they were commissioned in June 1992 they only had an operational service span of five months, being withdrawn in November 1992 as their maintenance was too complicated.

See also
 Fireboats in New York City

References 

Fireboats of New York City